Kanchan Awasthi is an Indian model and actress. She has appeared in the Indian television show Amma and Hindi movies including, Manto Remix, Bhootwali Love Story Gunwali Dulhaniya, and Fraud Saiyaan.

Movies

Web series

Television

Awards
 Mumbai Global Achievers (2016)
 India Unbound best upcoming actress (2018)
 Bharat Samman 2022

References

External links
 
 
 

Actresses from Lucknow
Living people
Year of birth missing (living people)
21st-century Indian actresses
Actresses in Hindi cinema
Actresses in Hindi television
Indian film actresses
Indian television actresses